Wohlrose is a river of Thuringia, Germany. It flows into the Ilm near Wolfsberg.

See also
List of rivers of Thuringia

Rivers of Thuringia
Rivers of Germany